Malek Al-Abdulmenem (born 8 March 1998) is a Saudi Arabian professional footballer who plays as a striker for Al-Fayha.

Career
Al-Abdulmenem began his career at the youth team of Al-Zulfi. He participated with the first team in the Saudi Third Division in 2016 and 2017. Al-Abdulmenem joined Al-Kholood on loan from Al-Zulfi in Saudi Third Division in 2017 and helped them achieve promotion to the Saudi Second Division. He was also the top scorer of the promotion play-offs. On 16 June 2017, Al-Abdulmenem joined Al-Hilal's U23 team. On 19 August 2018, Al-Abdulmenem joined Al-Jabalain. On 23 January 2019, Al-Abdulmenem joined Al-Kholood. On 29 January 2020, Al-Abdulemenem signed a four-year contract with Pro League club Al-Taawoun. On 30 June 2021, Al-Abdulmenem joined Al-Fayha on loan. On 30 January 2022, Al-Abdulmenem joined Al-Fayha on a permanent deal.

Career statistics

Club

Honours
Al-Fayha
King Cup: 2021–22

References

External links
 

1998 births
Living people
Association football forwards
Saudi Arabian footballers
Al-Zulfi FC players
Al-Kholood Club players
Al Hilal SFC players
Al-Taawoun FC players
Al-Fayha FC players
Saudi Professional League players
Saudi Second Division players
Saudi Fourth Division players